The Oakleigh Chargers is an Australian rules football club playing in the NAB League, the top statewide under-18 competition in Victoria, Australia.  They are based at Warrawee Park in Oakleigh, Victoria, representing the southeastern suburban area of Melbourne.  The Chargers were one of two additional metropolitan clubs introduced to the competition in 1995 as part of a plan by the AFL to replace the traditional club zones with independent junior clubs.  This was to help aid in player development and the process of the AFL draft. In June 2008 the Chargers moved into a new pavilion at Warrawee Park. The chargers are aligned to Collingwood, Richmond & Port Melbourne.
The Chargers have had the past 2 #1 AFL Draft picks and last #1 AFL W Draft picks making them one of the most successful development programs in Australia.

AFL Draftees History

1995: - 
1996: Heath Black, Patrick Steinfort 
1997: Luke Power, Paul DiGiovine 
1998: Ian Prendergast, Luke Penny, Adam Morgan, James White, Cameron McKenzie-McHarg 
1999: Caydn Beetham, Chad Davis, Luke Williams 
2000: Matthew Smith, Nick Gill 
2001: Sam Power, Campbell Brown, Ashley Hansen, Andrew Carrazzo, Bret Thornton, Will Slade, Justin Crow
2002: Cameron Croad, Stephen Gilham 
2003: Julian Rowe, David Jackson, Thomas Roach 
2004: Josh Gibson
2005: Marc Murphy, Beau Dowler, Matthew Laidlaw 
2006: Todd Goldstein, David MacKay, Robert Gray, Sam Sheldon
2007: Andy Otten 
2008: Luke Shuey, James Strauss, Dan Hannebery, Zac Clarke, Jordan Lisle, Casey Sibosado, Robin Nahas
2009: Jamie MacMillan, Sam Shaw, Ben Sinclair
2010: Andrew Gaff, Patrick Karnezis, Ryan Lester, Sam Crocker, Viv Michie, Alex Browne, Alex Johnson
2011: Tim Golds, Dom Tyson, Adam Tomlinson, Toby Greene, Tom Curran, Daniel Pearce, Matthew Arnot, Lin Jong
2012: Jackson Macrae, Kristian Jaksch, Jack Viney, Jason Ashby
2013: Jack Billings, Tom Cutler, Jay Kennedy Harris, Darcy Byrne-Jones, Lachlan Mackie, Will Maginness
2014: Jordan De Goey, Darcy Moore, Daniel McKenzie, Toby McLean, Marc Pittonet, Jack Sinclair
2015: David Cuningham, Alex Morgan, Jack Silvagni, Tom Phillips, Ben Crocker, Dan Houston
2016: Jordan Ridley, Sam McLarty, Ed Phillips, Josh Daicos, Dion Johnstone, Patrick Kerr, Nick Larkey, Taylin Duman
2017: Ed Richards, Jack Higgins, Toby Wooler
2018: Isaac Quaynor , Riley Collier-Dawkins, James Rowbottom, Xavier O'Neill, Will Kelly, James Jordon, Jack Ross, Noah Answerth, Ben Silvagni, Atu Bosenavulagi, Will Golds
2019: Matt Rowell, Noah Anderson, Dylan Williams, Nick Bryan, Trent Bianco, Lachlan Johnson
2020: Jamarra Ugle-Hagan, Will Phillips, Conor Stone, Finlay Macrae, Bailey Laurie, Reef McInnes, Maurice Rioli Jr
2021: Nick Daicos, Sam Darcy, Lachlan Rankin, Patrick Voss, Karl Warner
2022: Elijah Tsatas, George Wardlaw, Matthew Jefferson, Josh Weddle, Max Gruzewski, Alwyn Davey, Jr., Jack O'Sullivan,	Bailey MacDonald, Jayden Davey, Blake Drury (Rookie Draft)

Honours
Premierships (5): 2006, 2012, 2014, 2015, 2019, Girls 2021.
Runners-up (2): 2011, 2018
Wooden Spoons: Nil
Morrish Medallists: Jack Higgins (2017)
Grand Final Best-on-Ground Medalists: Matthew Rowell (2018, 2019)

References

External links

Oakleigh Chargers Website

NAB League clubs
1995 establishments in Australia
Australian rules football clubs established in 1995
Australian rules football clubs in Melbourne
NAB League Girls clubs
Sport in the City of Monash